The Porto Half Marathon (Portuguese: Meia-Maratona do Porto) is an annual half marathon road running event held in Porto, Portugal which follows the River Douro. Known as the Hyundai Porto Half Marathon for sponsorship reasons, the inaugural edition was held in 2007 and it typically takes place every mid-September.

The competition attracts top level elite athletes, mainly East African and Portuguese. Since its inception, all the men's and women's races have been won by East African competitors. Among those to top the men's podium are Olympic champions Haile Gebrselassie and Samuel Wanjiru, while former world champion over 10,000 metres, Berhane Adere, was the 2010 women's winner.

Zersenay Tadese holds the men's course record with his time of 59:30 minutes, set in 2011. Pamela Chepchumba (two-time winner) set the women's course record of 1:10:24 hours in 2009.

The half marathon course begins near Freixo Bridge and heads westwards, passing Cais de Gaia and Afurada before turning back on itself. It goes east, crossing the Douro over Dom Luís Bridge and again loops back once the route reaches the area near Freixo Bridge again. The course heads west towards the mouth of the Douro, going past Miragaia and finishing in the Jardim do Calém - Fluvial. In addition to the main half marathon event, there is a smaller 6 km mini-marathon which goes from Freixo Bridge to the Jardim do Calém - Fluvial.

The race is one of three major annual running events organised in Porto by Run Porto, alongside the Porto Marathon and the São Silvestre do Porto.

Past winners

Key:

References

External links
Official website
Race webpage at Run Porto

Half marathons in Portugal
Autumn events in Portugal
Recurring sporting events established in 2007
2007 establishments in Portugal
Sports competitions in Porto
21st century in Porto